This page provides the summary of RBBC1 Asia Pacific Qualifier/Finals.

Since 2012, Red Bull BC One has held a qualifier for the World Final in the Asia Pacific Region. The winner advances to the Red Bull BC One World Final.

Winners

2015

RBBC1 Asia Pacific 2015 results 
Location: Seoul, South Korea

2014

RBBC1 Asia Pacific 2014 results 
Location: Taipei, Taiwan

2013

2013 Main Event Competitor List

RBBC1 Asia Pacific 2013 results 
Location: Fukuoka, Japan

2012

RBBC1 Asia Pacific 2012 results
Location: Auckland, New Zealand

2011

RBBC1 Asia Pacific 2011 results 
Location: Tapei, Taiwan

Most Individual Battle Wins

Previous Participants by Country
Bboy in Bold denotes former Red Bull BC One Asia Pacific Winner.

Australia 

  Blond (2014-2015)
  Edit (2011)
  Monsta (2012)
  Sette (2013)

China

  Drunk (2013, 2015)
  Kevin (2015)
  Lil Chao (2014)
  Monkey J (2011-2012)

India

  Flying Machine (2015)

Indonesia 

  Wildson (2012)

Japan

  Babylon (2012)
  Issei (2013, 2015)
  Just Fit (2014-2015)
  Nori (2011, 2013–2015)
  Taisuke (2011, 2013–2014)
  Tomokazu (2012)
  Yooshi (2011)

Korea

  Blue (2011)
  Differ (2012)
  Fe (2012)
  Kill (2013)
  Leon (2015)
  Nauty One (2011)
  Octopus (2014-2015)
  Shorty Force (2012-2013)
  Skim (2014)
  Vero (2011, 2013, 2015)
  Zooty (2014)

Laos

  C-Lil (2011-2012,2014)

Malaysia

  Khenobu (2013-2014)
  Juicy (2012)
  Lego Sam (2015)
  Zen (2011)

New Zealand 

  Akorn (2012-2015)
  Grub D (2011-2012)

Philippines

  Allen Anas (2013)
  Haslah (2015)

Singapore 

  Gerard (2012)
  Lenard (2013)
  Sean (2014-2015)

Taiwan

  Boris (2014)
  Chen Chen (2014)
  Chuan (2013)
  Dragon Lee (2012)
  Free Nai (2013)
  Gred (2015)
  Hertz (2011)
  Lil Dragon (2011)
  Lil Han (2011)
  Taower (2012)
  Saru (2015)
  Sin (2014)

Thailand

  Cheno (2013)
  Pri One (2011)

Vietnam

  Slowz (2013)
  3T (2011, 2012)

External links
 Red Bull BC One Asia Pacific Finals 2013
 Red Bull BC One Asia Pacific Qualifier 2012

Red Bull BC One